Nineveh was an ancient Middle Eastern city founded by the Assyrians.

Nineveh may also refer to:

Places

United States
 Nineveh Township, Johnson County, Indiana
 Nineveh, Indiana, an unincorporated community
 Nineveh Creek, a river in Indiana
 Nineveh Township, Adair County, Missouri
 Nineveh, Missouri, an unincorporated community
 Nineveh Township, Lincoln County, Missouri
 Nineveh, New York, an unincorporated hamlet
 Nineveh, Pennsylvania, an unincorporated community
 Nineveh, Virginia, an unincorporated community

Elsewhere
 Nineveh, Lunenburg, Nova Scotia, Canada, a community
 Nineveh, an unincorporated place in the Municipality of the County of Victoria, Nova Scotia, Canada
 Nineveh, Worcestershire, England, three places
 Nineveh Governorate, a province of Iraq

Military
 Battle of Nineveh (612 BC), the fall of Assyria
 Battle of Nineveh (627),  the climactic battle of the Byzantine-Sassanid War
 Nineveh S. McKeen (1837–1890), American Civil War officer awarded the Medal of Honor

Music
 "Nineveh" (song) by Brooke Ligertwood, 2022

See also
 Isaac of Nineveh (c. 613–c. 700), Syriac Christian bishop, theologian and saint